Bertus ("Bart") Voskamp (born 6 June 1968 in Wageningen, Gelderland) is a retired road bicycle racer from the Netherlands, who was a professional rider from 1993 to 2005. He competed in five Tours de France. He also competed in the team time trial at the 1992 Summer Olympics.

In the 1997 Tour de France, on stage 19, Bart Voskamp crossed the finish line first, just before Jens Heppner. However, both cyclists were disqualified for touching each other during the sprint, so the victory went to former third place Mario Traversoni.

Tour de France results
1995 – 113th
1996 – 99th
1997 – 98th
1998 – retired
2000 – 115th

Major results

1991
 National Time Trial Championship
1992
Grote Rivierenprijs
1994
Vuelta a España:
Winner stage 17
Tiel
1995
Wingene
1996
Profronde van Surhuisterveen
Tour de France
Winner stage 18
Boxmeer
Noordwijk-aan-zee
1997
Mijl van Mares
Vuelta a España:
Winner stage 8
1998
Profronde van Stiphout
1999
 National Time Trial Championship
Profronde van Oostvoorne
2001
Henk Vos Memorial
 National Time Trial Championship
2002
Tour of Belgium
Profronde van Oostvoorne
Ster Elektrotoer
2003
Grand Prix Pino Cerami
Valkenburg Grotcriterium
2005
Gouden Pijl Emmen

See also
 List of Dutch Olympic cyclists

References

External links 

Official Tour de France results for Bart Voskamp

1968 births
Living people
Dutch male cyclists
People from Wageningen
Dutch Tour de France stage winners
Dutch Vuelta a España stage winners
Dutch cycling time trial champions
UCI Road World Championships cyclists for the Netherlands
Doping cases in cycling
Dutch sportspeople in doping cases
Cyclists from Gelderland
Olympic cyclists of the Netherlands
Cyclists at the 1992 Summer Olympics
20th-century Dutch people